The Spyckerscher See and Mittelsee Nature Reserve is a nature reserve in the German state of Mecklenburg-Vorpommern. It includes the two lakes named as well as the adjacent shore and shallow water areas, covering a total area of 344 hectares. It was designated as a reserve on 5 November 1990 and expanded in 1994. Neighbouring villages are Glowe in the northwest and Spyker in the east. Its conservation aim is the preservation of a very attractive section of the North Rügen Bodden, a lagoon landscape which is a habitat for numerous animal and plant species.

The reserve borders immediately on the Großer Jasmunder Bodden.

The reserve is protected under EU law as part of the Nordrügensche Boddenlandschaft Special Area of Conservation and the Binnenbodden von Rügen Special Protection Area

The reserve is in good condition thanks to the cessation of human activities. Only anglers and surfers use the area. The reserve is owned by the state's Foundation for the Environment and Conservation.

A footpath runs through the area.

References

Literature

External links 
Nature reserve act
M-V environmental map portal with geodata (reserve boundary, biotope mapping, etc.)

Nature reserves in Mecklenburg-Western Pomerania
Vorpommern-Rügen
Glowe
Geography of Rügen
North Rügen Bodden
Protected areas established in 1990
1990 establishments in Germany